The Last Farm (Icelandic title Síðasti bærinn) is a 2004 Icelandic short film. It was directed by Rúnar Rúnarsson, and stars Icelandic actor Jón Sigurbjörnsson. The film was scored by Kjartan Sveinsson, a keyboardist for the band Sigur Rós.

It was shot at an abandoned farm in the Westfjords in Iceland which can be visited easily. In fact, a different tragedy happened in this house and was, people say, thus the inspiration for this film.

It was nominated for the 2005 Academy Award for Best Live Action Short Film.

Plot 
His daughter Lilja has decided that her father, the farmer Hrafn, and his wife Gróa, should move into a home for the elderly. Both Lilja and the delivery man Jón have been led to believe that Hrafn has been working to close up his remote farmhouse. What no one knows [SPOILER ALERT!] is that Gróa has not been taking a nap the past two days; she has died, and Hrafn has been busy preparing a grave for them both. By the time his daughter and family pull up to the farmhouse, Hrafn has laid himself at the bottom of the pit he has dug, next to the coffin he has built for his wife, and pulled the rope which causes a load of dirt to fall, burying him alive.

Awards
Although the film failed to win the Academy Award for Best Live Action Short Film in 2005, it has won 12 other awards including the Edda Award for Short Film of the Year in 2004, the ARTE Short Film Award and the Youth Jury Award at the 2006 Dresden Film Festival, and the Audience Award for Best Film at the 2006 FEST Youth Video and Film Festival.

External links 
 Official site
 
 Film at Google Video

2004 films
Films directed by Rúnar Rúnarsson
Icelandic short films